|}

The Denman Chase is a Grade 2 National Hunt steeplechase in Great Britain which is open to horses aged five years or older. It is run at Newbury over a distance of about 2 miles and 7½ furlongs (2 miles 7 furlongs and 86 yards, or 4,706 metres), and during its running there are eighteen fences to be jumped. The race is scheduled to take place each year in February.

The event was originally named the Aon Chase, after its first sponsors Aon Group Ltd, and it was first run in 2000. It was promoted to Listed status in 2002, and to Grade 2 level in 2003. The planned running in 2009 was abandoned at Newbury because of snow, and so the race was switched to an alternative venue, Kempton Park. The rearranged event was titled the Levy Board Chase. In 2012 the sponsorship was taken over by Betfair and renamed the Denman Chase in honour of Denman, who won the race in 2008 and also won two Hennessy Gold Cups at Newbury.

The race serves as one of the principal trials for the Cheltenham Gold Cup in March. Four horses have won both events in the same year – Kauto Star (2007), Denman (2008), Coneygree (2015) and Native River (2018).

Records

Most successful horse (3 wins):
 Native River – 2017, 2018, 2020

Leading jockey (4 wins):
 Richard Johnson – Shooting Light (2004), Farmer Jack (2005), Coneygree (2015), Native River (2018)

Leading trainer (10 wins):
 Paul Nicholls (horse racing) – See More Business (2000), Shotgun Willy (2001), Valley Henry (2003), Kauto Star (2007), Denman (2008), Tricky Trickster (2010), Noland (2011), Silvianaco Conti (2013), Clan Des Obeaux (2019), Secret Investor (2021)

Winners

See also
 Horse racing in Great Britain
 List of British National Hunt races

References
 Racing Post:

 pedigreequery.com – Aon Chase – Newbury.

External links
 Race Recordings 

National Hunt races in Great Britain
Newbury Racecourse
National Hunt chases
Recurring sporting events established in 2000
2000 establishments in England